A General Eyre is a kind of medieval traveling judicial court. General Eyre may also refer to:

James Eyre (British Army officer) (1930–2003), British Army major general
Trulan A. Eyre (born 1957), U.S. Air Force general
Vincent Eyre (1811–1881), British Indian Army major general
Wayne Eyre (fl. 1980s–2020s), Canadian Army general
William Eyre (British Army officer) (1805–1859), British Army major general